The RUR-4 "Weapon Alpha" (originally Weapon Able) was an American naval ahead-throwing anti-submarine warfare (ASW) rocket launcher. It was designed between 1946 and 1949, and was installed on warships from 1951 to 1969. Unlike depth charges, it was designed to attack enemy submarines without requiring the attacking ship to be located directly above the submarine being attacked.

Development 
Similar to the earlier American Mousetrap, 375mm (14.8") Swedish Bofors, and 250mm (9.8") and 300mm (11.8") Soviet systems, all of which use multiple rockets, Weapon Alpha was developed toward the end of World War II, in response to the German Type XXI U-boat. Begun in a crash program in 1944–5 and put in service before undergoing operational evaluation, it emerged in 1949 as a 227-kg (500 lb) 127mm (5") rocket with a 113-kg (250 lb) warhead that sank at 12 m/s (40 ft/s) (compared to a depth charge, which sank at 2.7–5 m/s (8.9–16.5 ft/s)), an influence or time pistol, and a range of 360–730 m (400–800 yd). Coupled to the new SQG-1 depth-finding sonar (for setting the time fuse, rather than the hydrostatic pistol of a depth charge), it was to be fired from a revolving Mark 108 launcher (with 22 rounds of ready ammunition) at up to twelve rounds per minute. The ready-service magazine could not be reloaded while Weapon Alpha was in use.

It was replaced by the RUR-5 ASROC, which was developed by the U.S. Navy in the 1950s. Nonetheless, Weapon Alpha remained in service through the 1960s until supplanted by ASROC.

Gallery

References

Sources
 Fitzsimons, Bernard, ed. Encyclopedia of Twentieth Century Weapons and Warfare (London: Phoebus Publishing Co, 1978), "Weapon Alpha", Volume 24, p. 2589.
 Fitzsimons, Bernard, ed. Encyclopedia of Twentieth Century Weapons and Warfare (London: Phoebus Publishing Co, 1978), "Mousetrap", Volume 19, pp. 1946-7.
 Fitzsimons, Bernard, ed. Encyclopedia of Twentieth Century Weapons and Warfare (London: Phoebus Publishing Co, 1978),  "Depth Charge", Volume 7, p. 730.
 
 DiGiulian, Tony Navweaps.com US ASW weapons page

External links
 

RUR004
RUR004
Explosive weapons
RUR004
RUR004
Military equipment introduced in the 1950s